Reverend George Henry Schodde [ Allegheny City, April 15, 1854 - September 15, 1917] was a scholar of coptic language and Old Testament pseudepigrapha.

He graduated Ph.D (Leipzig 1876) and joined the Lutheran General Council (USA). 
He was Professor at Capital University, Columbus, Ohio. He produced a translation of 1 Enoch in 1885.

Personal life
His parents were George F. Schodde and Mary Louise Tücke. In 1881, he married Mary Dorsch.

Bibliography
 Rev. Schodde (1882). The Book of Enoch. Translated from the Ethiopic (Geez) with introduction and notes (also known as 1 Enoch or Enoch Ethiopic), pp. 293
 Rev. Schodde (1888). The Book of Jubilees. Written by Moses on Mount Horeb, translated from the Ethiopic, pp. 154
 The Protestant Church in Germany
 The error of modern Missouri
 Outlines of Biblical hermeneutics
 Hêrmâ Nabî Ethiopic version of Pastor Hermae
 Pentateuch Testimony
 The Development of New Testament Judaism

References

American biblical scholars
1854 births
1917 deaths
Book of Enoch
Ge'ez language